Riksvei 22 (Rv22) runs between Hvam in Skedsmo and Øra in Fredrikstad. The road is 117.3 km, of which 35.8 km is in Akershus and 81.5 km in Østfold.

Route
Route: Hvam - Kjeller - Lillestrøm - Vinsnes - Fetsund, crossing Glomma - south, and then east through Øyeren - Båstad - Skjønhaug - Mysen - Rakkestad - Ise - Hafslund - Årum -  - Sellebakk - Lundheim - Øra.

Prior to 1 January 2010, the road ran between Gjelleråsen and Halden, see fylkesvei 22. In March 2019, the road was extended from Rakkestad to Fredrikstad, replacing Riksvei 111.

External links 
 NAFs Vegbok: Oslo – Mysen – Holtet «Den grønne veien» vegrute R22: «Den grønne veien» – et hyggelig alternativ til E6 sydover mot Sverige.

022
Roads in Skedsmo
Roads in Fet
Roads in Trøgstad
Roads in Eidsberg
Roads in Rakkestad
Roads in Viken